The 1968 CONCACAF Pre-Olympic Tournament was the second edition of the CONCACAF Pre-Olympic Tournament, the quadrennial, international football tournament organised by the CONCACAF to determine which national teams from the North, Central America and Caribbean region qualify for the Olympic football tournament. 

Mexico, as host nation, qualified directly for the 1968 Summer Olympics together with final round winners, El Salvador and Guatemala as CONCACAF representatives.

Qualification

Qualified teams
The following teams qualified for the final tournament.

1 Only final tournament.

Final round

|}

El Salvador won 4–1 on aggregate and qualified for the 1968 Summer Olympics.

Guatemala advance via a drawing of lots after a 3–3 aggregate and qualified for the 1968 Summer Olympics.

Qualified teams for Summer Olympics
The following three teams from CONCACAF qualified for the 1968 Summer Olympics, including Mexico which qualified as hosts.

2 Bold indicates champions for that year. Italic indicates hosts for that year.

References 

1968
Oly
 
Football qualification for the 1968 Summer Olympics